Gregory Orrin Brewer (born July 6, 1951) is the fourth and current bishop of the Episcopal Diocese of Central Florida.

Biography 
Brewer was born in Richmond, Virginia. After studies at Virginia Theological Seminary he was ordained to the diaconate on June 5, 1976, and to the priesthood on January 6, 1977. He was consecrated as a bishop on March 24, 2012. He was involved in musical theater from a young age.

He is currently a member of Communion Partners, an Episcopalian group which opposed the 77th General Episcopal Convention's decision to authorize the blessing of same-sex marriages in 2012. The measure to allow the blessing of same-sex unions won by a 111–41 vote with 3 abstentions.

See also
 List of Episcopal bishops of the United States
 Historical list of the Episcopal bishops of the United States

References

External links 
Gregory Brewer consecrated as bishop of Central Florida
Diocesan website

1951 births
Living people
People from Richmond, Virginia
Virginia Theological Seminary alumni
Episcopal bishops of Central Florida